Konstantinos Papadopoulos (born 8 August 2000) is a Greek professional footballer who plays as a midfielder for Super League 2 club Diagoras.

References

2000 births
Living people
Greek footballers
Greek expatriate footballers
Super League Greece players
Super League Greece 2 players
Gamma Ethniki players
PAS Giannina F.C. players
Panachaiki F.C. players
Diagoras F.C. players
Association football midfielders
Footballers from Ioannina